Alexandre Baron (born 6 December 1994) is a French racing driver from Narbonne.

After karting, Baron raced in the French F4 Championship in 2012 and won the championship with nine wins in 13 races. In 2013 he began the season in Formula Renault 2.0 Eurocup but left the series after eight races. He also made five Formula Renault 2.0 NEC starts. That autumn he made four starts in the U.S. F2000 National Championship for Belardi Auto Racing and won two races in four starts, including his first start and the season finale.

In 2014 he signed with Belardi to race in the Indy Lights series.

Racing record

Career summary

† As he was a guest driver, Baron was ineligible to score points.

Indy Lights

U.S. F2000 National Championship

* Season still in progress.

References

External links
 

1994 births
Living people
People from Narbonne
French racing drivers
French F4 Championship drivers
Formula Renault Eurocup drivers
Formula Renault 2.0 NEC drivers
Indy Lights drivers
U.S. F2000 National Championship drivers
Sportspeople from Aude
Karting World Championship drivers
Auto Sport Academy drivers
Belardi Auto Racing drivers
R-ace GP drivers
ART Grand Prix drivers